The Quechan (or Yuma) (Quechan: Kwatsáan 'those who descended') are a Native American tribe who live on the Fort Yuma Indian Reservation on the lower Colorado River in Arizona and California just north of the Mexican border. Despite their name, they are not related to the Quechua people of the Andes. Members are enrolled into the Quechan Tribe of the Fort Yuma Indian Reservation. The federally recognized Quechan tribe's main office is located in Winterhaven, California.  Its operations and the majority of its reservation land are located in California, United States.

History
The historic Yuman-speaking people in this region were skilled warriors and active traders, maintaining exchange networks with the Pima in southern Arizona, New Mexico, and with peoples of the Pacific coast.

The first significant contact of the Quechan with Europeans was with the Spanish explorer Juan Bautista de Anza and his party in the winter of 1774. Relations were friendly.  On Anza's return from his second trip to Alta California in 1776, the chief of the tribe and three of his men journeyed to Mexico City to petition the Viceroy of New Spain for the establishment of a mission. The chief Palma and his three companions were baptized in Mexico City on February 13, 1777. Palma was given the Spanish baptismal name Salvador Carlos Antonio.

Spanish settlement among the Quechan did not go smoothly; the tribe rebelled from July 17–19, 1781 and killed four priests and thirty soldiers.  They also attacked and damaged the Spanish mission settlements of San Pedro y San Pablo de Bicuñer and Puerto de Purísima Concepción, killing many. The following year, the Spanish retaliated with military action against the tribe.

After the United States annexed the territories after winning the Mexican–American War, it engaged in the Yuma War from 1850 to 1853 in response to a conflict between the Quechan and Jaeger's Ferry and the Glanton Gang, after the Quechan had established a rival ferry service on the Colorado River. During which, the historic Fort Yuma was built across the Colorado River from the present day Yuma, Arizona.

Population
Estimates for the pre-contact populations of most native groups in California have varied substantially (see population of Native California). Alfred L. Kroeber (1925:883) put the 1770 population of the Quechan at 2,500. Jack D. Forbes (1965:341–343) compiled historical estimates and suggested that before they were first contacted, the Quechan had numbered 4,000 or a few more.

Kroeber estimated the population of the Quechan in 1910 as 750. By 1950, there were reported to be just under 1,000 Quechan living on the reservation and more than 1,100 off it (Forbes 1965:343). The 2000 census reported a resident population of 2,376 persons on the Fort Yuma Indian Reservation.

Language

The Quechan language is part of the Yuman language family.

Fort Yuma Native American Reservation

The Fort Yuma Indian Reservation is a part of the Quechan's traditional lands. Both the county and city are named for the tribe.

See also
 Quechan traditional narratives
 Quechan language
 Fort Yuma
 Blythe geoglyphs
 Indigenous peoples of the Americas
 Classification of indigenous peoples of the Americas
 Native Americans in the United States

Footnotes

Further reading
 
 
 
 Zappia, Natale A. (2014). Traders and Raiders: The Indigenous World of the Colorado Basin, 1540–1859. Chapel Hill, NC: University of North Carolina Press.

External links

 Quechan Tribal Council, official website
 Fort Yuma-Quechan Tribe, Inter Tribal Council of Arizona

 
Native American tribes in California
Native American tribes in Arizona
Federally recognized tribes in the United States
Indigenous peoples in Mexico
Yuma, Arizona
Winterhaven, California
Geography of Yuma County, Arizona
Geography of Imperial County, California